Tales of a Traveler is an album by the American alternative country group Blue Mountain, released in 1999.

Critical reception
No Depression wrote that Stirratt and Hudson's "harmonies, and, just as importantly, the subtle, fleeting moments when their voices veer off course are Blue Mountain’s musical signature." The Washington Post thought that "Hudson and Stirratt borrow widely and wisely—grabbing elements from X, Johnny Cash, Lynyrd Skynyrd, J.J. Cale and especially Neil Young, both in his pretty acoustic and noisy electric phases—but they give it all backwoods Mississippi spin and make it intensely personal." Exclaim! noted that the band "even venture into Dixie-fried rock territory, albeit in a mercifully less greasy form than the Molly Hatchets of yesteryear."

Track listing

Personnel
 Dan Baird - acoustic, electric, slide guitars
 Jef Callaway - trombone
 Frank Coutch - vocals, drums, percussion
 Don Heffington: drums, congas
 Caroline Herring - vocals
 Cary Hudson - vocals
 Jim Spake - tenor saxophone, baritone saxophone
 Laurie Stirratt - vocals, guitar

References

1999 albums
Blue Mountain (band) albums
Roadrunner Records albums